Rui Maria de Araújo (born 21 May 1964) is an East Timorese politician who served as its prime minister from 2015 to 2017.  He is a physician and member of Fretilin.

He was Minister of Health from 2001 to 2006 and Deputy Prime Minister from 2006 to 2007.

Araújo was inaugurated as Prime Minister of East Timor on 16 February 2015. He was replaced in 2017 by Mari Alkatiri.

Personal life 
Araújo was born in the village of Mape, Cova Lima, on 21 May 1964. He is married to Teresa António Madeira Soares and is the father of two children.

Araújo received his medical degree from the Faculty of Medicine, Sultan Agung Islamic University in Semarang, Indonesia. He did training in otolaryngology (ear nose throat speciality and head and neck surgery) at the Medical Faculty of Udayana University in Bali, Indonesia.  He has a Masters in Public Health from his studies at Otago University in New Zealand.

References 

1964 births
East Timorese physicians
Otolaryngologists
Living people
Udayana University alumni
Fretilin politicians
People from Cova Lima District
Prime Ministers of East Timor
Government ministers of East Timor
Health ministers of East Timor